The Texas mouse (Peromyscus attwateri) is a species of rodent in the family Cricetidae. It is found in Arkansas, Kansas, Missouri, Oklahoma, and Texas in the United States. This species is named in honor of Henry Philemon Attwater.

Description
The Texas mouse is considered medium-sized for its genus. It has usually dark or dusky ankles, and the ear is medium-sized. Color of the dorsum is dark mixed with brown and blackish hairs, and its side color is pinkish cinnamon, and the belly and feet have a pure white color. The mouse is morphological adapted to have a long tail, for balancing when climbing a vertical surface, and large eyes adapted to activity in darkness.

Adult Peromyscus attwateri's total length is usually about 182 to 220 mm with weight 25-35 grams. The tail is about 83-104mm, ear length is about 18–20 mm, and length of hind foot is about 24–27 mm. Texas mouse found in Missouri. The specimen is a male measuring 171 mm of total length, 89 mm of tail, 23 mm of hind foot, and 19 mm of ear by Dr. Hershel W. Morphological size variation in Texas mouse appears related with assemblage of physiologic and ecologic factors.

Their skull is large length in 27.6 to 30.4 mm, and they have wide and not rounded braincase. They have large pterygoid fossa, medium auditory bullae that larger than in P. maniculatus and P. leucopus but smaller than in P. truei.

Ecology

Range and habitat

P. attwateri is found in western Arkansas, southeastern Kansas, southern Missouri, south-central and northeastern Oklahoma in forest, and Texas. 
They inhabit not only rocky areas with high cliffs and slopes under juniper, but also limestone with woods such as oak and black hickory vegetation because of predators. Cedar glades and hardwood forests are their primary habitats. 
Estimated population density is 0.7 to 5.4/ha at different seasons in various regions. The average home range of the Texas mouse is 0.2 ha (0.49 acres), and the male home range is twice that of the female.

Diet
The Texas mouse is omnivorous. Acorns are often used in winter and spring, and its diet is a variety of animal and plant material,   depending on availability. Foods include berries, seeds, flowers, nuts, fruits, and insects.

Behavior
Texas mouse is mostly nocturnal and arboreal, and does not hibernate. It has morphological adaptations for tree climbing - a long tail and large hind feet; it spends about 70% of its time climbing in trees.

Reproduction
The Texas mouse's breeding period occurs in autumn and spring, but limited breeding occurs in winter. No evidence that breeding occurs  during the late spring and summer has been found. It can breed multiple times during the available seasons and gestation lasts 23 days; lactation lasts about 8 days. The typical number of young per litter is three or four, with seasonal variation. Females collected in winter have fewer embryos than in spring.

The young of the mouse weigh about 1.5 g, and are hairless with closed eyes and pinkly skin. Their hair starts to grow after two days, and two weeks after, the eyes open. A month after, their young are weaned, and they leave the nest to live alone. Some young, though, live together with their mother for a longer  time.

References

Further reading
Musser, G. G. and M. D. Carleton. 2005. Superfamily Muroidea. pp. 894–1531 in Mammal Species of the World a Taxonomic and Geographic Reference. D. E. Wilson and D. M. Reeder eds. Johns Hopkins University Press, Baltimore.

Peromyscus
Mammals described in 1895
Taxonomy articles created by Polbot